Matthew "Matt" Tanzini (born June 3, 1976 in Binghamton, New York) is an American soccer attacking midfielder.

Tanzini started his career with West Virginia University, spent three seasons with the Harrisburg Heat.  During the 2000-2001 season, the Heat played in the indoor National Professional Soccer League.  In 2001, the NSPL was restructured and became the Major Indoor Soccer League.  Tanzini then spent two seasons with the Heat in MISL. In 2003, he signed for the Kansas City Comets, but left to join outdoor side Harrisburg City Islanders before playing a match. He then played four seasons with the Islanders before leaving at the end of the 2007 season.

References

External links
Matt Tanzini profile at the Harrisburg City Islanders official website

1976 births
Living people
American soccer players
National Professional Soccer League (1984–2001) players
Major Indoor Soccer League (2001–2008) players
Harrisburg Heat players
Penn FC players
USL Second Division players
Association football midfielders